Klaus Hennig (born 27 January 1944) is a German judo athlete, who competed for the SC Dynamo Hoppegarten / Sportvereinigung (SV) Dynamo. He won medals at international competitions included over 15 national titles. He also competed in two events at the 1972 Summer Olympics.

References

External links
 

1944 births
Living people
German male judoka
Olympic judoka of East Germany
Judoka at the 1972 Summer Olympics
20th-century German people
21st-century German people